The Bulldog class was a four ship class of survey vessels in service with the Royal Navy from the late 1960s until the start of the 21st century. Initially designed with service overseas in mind, they spent most of their careers off the British coast. A fifth ship was subsequently built to a modified design to support them in their activities. Decommissioned and sold off at the end of the 20th and start of the 21st centuries, they have continued in service as civilian vessels, with some being converted to private yachts and others entering other commercial sectors.

Design
The Bulldogs were designated as coastal survey vessels, and were a smaller variant of the earlier  designs. All four ships were built by Brooke Marine utilising merchant hulls. The resulting design was stable in a variety of sea conditions, and the class was considered to be good seakeepers, with an all-welded construction, a bulbous bow and a high flared forecastle. Anti-rolling tanks and twin rudders were also fitted. The ships used eight-cylinder Lister Blackstone diesel engines powering two variable-pitch propellers and were fitted with precise navaids, specialised echo-sounders, magnetometer and a variety of sonar and radar. Bulldog was retrospectively fitted with Marconi Hydrosearch sector scanning sonar. In addition they carried two small surveying boats (18 ft/35 ft), fitted with an array of equipment and capable of conducting surveys in shallow water.

Careers
Despite the original intention to use them overseas, the growth of the exploitation of the oil and gas reserves in the North Sea from the 1960s onwards led to them spending most of their time engaged in survey work off the British coast. The increased demand for their services led to the Admiralty ordering a fifth ship to a modified design in the 1980s, which became .

Fox was the first of the class to leave service, being sold to commercial interests in April 1989. Fawn was paid off in October 1991 and sold to interests in West Germany to become an offshore support vessel of the West African and Chinese coasts under the name Red Fulmar. Bulldog was paid off on 26 July 2001 and sold the following month for conversion to a luxury yacht. A major fire broke out while she was moored at Nelson, New Zealand and the conversion was not completed.  Beagle was the last to leave service. She was paid off on 7 February 2002 and sold the following month to a yacht company at Poole for conversion.

Ships

Notes

References

Auxiliary research ship classes
 
Ship classes of the Royal Navy